Murina recondita is a species of bat found in Taiwan.

Taxonomy
Murina recondita was described as a new species in 2009. The holotype had been collected in 2003 in Ruisui, Taiwan. Its species name "recondita" means "hidden" or "concealed", and was chosen in reference to the dull coloration of its fur.

Description

Range and habitat
Murina recondita is endemic to Taiwan, where it occurs in hilly and mountainous areas.

References

External links
 

Mammals described in 2009
Endemic fauna of Taiwan
Bats of Asia
Murininae